In the women's 3-metre springboard event at the 2015 European Diving Championships, there were 20 entrants in the preliminary round and 12 in the final round. The gold medal winner was Tania Cagnotto of Italy.

Medalists

Results

Green denotes finalists

2015 European Diving Championships
Euro